The 68th Directors Guild of America Awards, honoring the outstanding directorial achievements in films, documentary and television in 2015, were presented on February 6, 2016 at the Hyatt Regency Century Plaza. The ceremony was hosted by Jane Lynch for the third time. The nominees for the feature film categories were announced on January 12, 2016 and the nominations for directing achievements in television, documentaries and commercials were announced on January 13, 2016.

Winners and nominees

Film

Television

Commercials

Lifetime Achievement in Television
 Joe Pytka

Frank Capra Achievement Award
 Mary Rae Thewlis

Franklin J. Schaffner Achievement Award
 Tom McDermott

References

External links
  

Directors Guild of America Awards
2015 film awards
2015 television awards
Direct
Direct
2016 awards in the United States